Map of places in Gwynedd compiled from this list
See the list of places in Wales for places in other principal areas.

This is a list of cities, towns and villages in the principal area of Gwynedd, Wales.

 

A
Aberangell, Aberdaron, Aberdesach, Aberdyfi, Abererch, Abergwyngregyn, Abergynolwyn, Aberllefenni, Abersoch, Afon Wen, Arthog

B
Bala, Bangor, Barmouth, Beddgelert, Bethania, Bethel, Bethesda, Betws Garmon, Blaenau Ffestiniog, Boduan, Bontddu, Bontnewydd, Botwnnog, Brithdir, Bryncroes, Bryn-crug, Bwlch-derwin, Bwlchtocyn

C
Caeathro, Caerhun, Caernarfon, Capel Curig, Carmel, Chwilog, Clynnog Fawr, Clwt-y-bont, Corris Uchaf, Corris, Criccieth, Croesor, Cwm-y-glo

D
Deiniolen, Dinas Dinlle, Dinas Mawddwy, Dinas, Dinorwig, Dolgellau, Dolmelinllyn

E
Edern, Efailnewydd, Esgairgeiliog

F
Fairbourne, Friog

G
Ganllwyd, Garndolbenmaen, Gellilydan, Glasinfryn, Groeslon

H
Harlech

L
Llanaber, Llanaelhaearn, Llanbedr, Llandbedrgoch, Llanbedrog, Llanberis, Llandanwg, Llanegryn, Llandegwning, Llandeiniolen, Llandwrog, Llanelltyd, Llanengan, Llanfair Llanfihangel-y-pennant, Abergynolwyn, Llanfihangel-y-pennant, Cwm Pennant, Llanfrothen, Llangwnnadl, Llangybi, Llaniestyn, Llan Ffestiniog,  Llangian, Llanllechid, Llanymawddwy, Llannor, Llanrug, Llanwnda, Llanystumdwy,  Llithfaen, Llwyndyrys, Llwyngwril

M
Mallwyd, Maentwrog, Minffordd, Morfa Nefyn, Mynydd Llandegai, Mynytho

N
Nantlle, Nantmor, Nasareth, Nebo, Nefyn

P
Pant Glas, Penffridd, Penisa'r Waun, Penmaenpool, Pennal, Penrhos, Penrhosgarnedd Penrhyndeudraeth, Pentre Gwynfryn, Penygroes, Pen-y-meinl, Pistyll, Pontllyfni, Pontrug,  Porth Dinllaen, Porthmadog, Portmeirion, Prenteg,  Pwllheli

R
Rachub, Rhiw, Rhiwddolion, Rhiwlas (in Llanddeiniolen community), Rhiwlas (in Llandderfel community), Rhosgadfan, Rhostryfan, Rhoshirwaun, Rhoslefair, Rhyd Ddu, Rhyd-y-clafdy, Rhos-y-gwaliau

S
Sarn Meyllteyrn

T
Tal-y-bont (near Bangor), Tal-y-bont (near Barmouth), Talysarn, Trawsfynydd, Trefor, Tregarth, Tremadog, Tudweiliog, Tywyn, Talsarnau

U
Uwchmynydd

W
Waunfawr

Y
Y Felinheli, Y Ffor

See also
List of places in Gwynedd (categorised)

Gwynedd